14-3-3 protein eta also referred to as 14-3-3η is a protein that in humans is encoded by the YWHAH gene.

Function 

This gene product belongs to the 14-3-3 family of proteins that are normally intracellular in nature and help to mediate signal transduction by binding to phosphoserine-containing proteins. This highly conserved protein family is found in both plants and mammals, and this protein is 99% identical to the mouse, rat and bovine orthologs. This gene contains a 7 bp repeat sequence in its 5' UTR, and changes in the number of this repeat has been associated with early-onset schizophrenia.

Protein-protein interactions 

YWHAH has been shown to interact with:

 C-Raf, 
 CDC25B, 
 EPB41L3, 
 Glucocorticoid receptor, 
 KIF5B, 
 KLC3, 
 Phosphoinositide-dependent kinase-1, 
 RIMS1, 
 RIMS2, 
 TLX2,
 TNFAIP3,  and
 ZFP36.

Externalization 

14-3-3n is normally intracellular. Two main mechanisms resulting in the release of 14-3-3η into the extracellular environment have been reported:

 exosomal mediated process; and
 necroptosis;

14-3-3 proteins are components of small extracellular vesicles that are secreted by most, if not all cells. Tumor necrosis factor alpha stimulation of macrophages, but not IL-6, promotes the secretion of 14-3-3η into the extracellular space through a TNF alpha-dependent necroptotic mechanism.

Role in rheumatoid arthritis 

A 2021 systematic literature review published by authors from the NHS Foundation Trust in the United Kingdom conclude the following about the 14-3-3n biomarker:

 adequate evidence for helping to assess the veracity of the diagnosis and severity of early rheumatoid arthritis (RA); 
 can be combined with existing markers for severity and to provide possible ways of stratifying patients into more effective treatment groups; and
 a welcome new addition for rheumatologist’s diagnostic, treatment and strategy in RA.

Role of extracellular 14-3-3η 

Exogenous 14-3-3η stimulation has been reported to stimulate various cell types including macrophages, monocytes, and fibroblast-like synoviocytes activating key cell signalling cascades including:

 JAK-STAT signaling pathway
 PI3K/AKT/mTOR pathway
 MAPK/ERK pathway
 JNK/AP-1 pathway
 FOXO3-SNAI1

Stimulation of cells by extracellular 14-3-3η has been reported to increase key factors relevant to the pathophysiology of rheumatoid arthritis, including:

 Tumor necrosis factor alpha
 Interleukin 6
 CCL2/MCP-1
 Matrix metalloproteinase (MMPs)
 RANKL

Exogenous stimulation of human fibroblast-like synoviocytes, in a dose dependent manner, resulted in the development of invadosomes. Silencing of 14-3-3n via shRNA resulted in decreased invadosome formation. Invadosomes are finger-like projections that bud from the cell membrane and are directly associated with increasing the migratory or invasive potential of cells. In RA, this might account for how the disease travels to neighboring joints. 

Taken together, extracellular 14-3-3η upregulates pro-inflammatory factors directly that are targeted with small molecules and/or biological Disease-modifying antirheumatic drug (DMARDs), including TNF, IL-6 and Janus kinases. The table below defines the medicines by target.

Key Clinical Findings 

The body of independent evidence supporting the clinical utility of 14-3-3η continues to expand. As of 2022, there have been over 50 peer-reviewed citations and 200 conference proceedings describing the clinical value of the 14-3-3η biomarker.  

Diagnostic Value of 14-3-3η Marker. As shown in the table above, a number of studies have evaluated the specificity, sensitivity and value of 14-3-3η in combination with rheumatoid factor (RF) and/or the anti-cyclic citrullinated protein (ACPA, anti-CCP). According to Abdelhafiz et al. meta-analysis of all studies reported a pooled sensitivity of 73% (95% CI: 71 - 75) and a pooled specificity of 88% (95% CI: 87 - 90). In an Early Undifferentiated Polyarthritis (EUPA) cohort from the University of Sherbrooke where 14-3-3n were assessed in 331 subjects, the diagnostic accuracy of RF, CCP and RF and/or CCP was increased by: 24.0%, 36.8% and 15.0% respectively.  

Prognostic Value of the 14-3-3η Marker. An analysis of 331 patients from the EUPA cohort with five (5) years of longitudinal follow-up demonstrated that baseline 14-3-3η positivity, at the diagnostic cut-off of > 0.19 ng/ml, was associated with more radiographic progression over the five (5) years. Sustained and/or elevated 14-3-3η positivity over the course of the five (5) years of follow-up was associated with a higher likelihood of radiographic progression. Serial decreases in 14-3-3η of 0.76 ng/ml or reversion to a negative test during follow-up was associated with less subsequent radiographic progression. 

Serial Changes in 14-3-3η Marker with Effective Disease Management. 14-3-3η has been described as a modifiable marker, with post-treatment levels having been reported to decrease, stay the same, or in some cases increase despite patients being treated with different classes of therapy including small molecule and biological DMARDs like Methotrexate, Adalimumab, Tocilizumab, Tofacitinib and Upadacitinib.    Post-treatment decreases and/or reversion to a negative 14-3-3η test is typically associated with better patient outcomes, whereas sustained positivity and/or increases in the 14-3-3η marker longitudinally is often associated with worse outcomes.  

Further research is required to determine if certain therapies have a greater impact on the modifiability of 14-3-3η. Current data points towards more of a proximal or interactive effect between 14-3-3η and TNF alpha. 

Targeting Drug Free Remission. With the advent of more effective RA treatments and more aggressive patient management strategies, drug free remission is now a possibility however, an important consideration when weaning a patient off of a DMARD is the concomitant risk of flaring. In a cohort of 331 patients from the EUPA cohort, Carrier et al. demonstrated that 14-3-3η positivity at the time of remission was associated with increased likelihood of radiographic progression.  Whilst further research is required to investigate how 14-3-3η informs risk of flaring and radiographic progression in patients that have achieved remission, the current data indicates that patients in clinical remission with a positive 14-3-3η test should be considered as higher risk for disease progression.  

Detection of 14-3-3η Pre-Disease or in Other Arthritides. As earlier detection of RA is often associated with better clinical outcomes, evaluating how 14-3-3η informs risk of disease onset in asymptomatic patients is and will continue to be of paramount importance to investigate. In a study by Hitchon et al, the authors demonstrated that 14-3-3η levels were detectable in 1st degree relatives of  patients diagnosed with RA, and that levels of 14-3-3η increased in 1st degree relatives at the time of transition to RA. The authors suggested that 14-3-3η was an imminent marker of RA transition. Additional studies in a larger subset of patients is required to fully evaluate when, why and how 14-3-3η levels increase in at-risk patients. 

14-3-3η has also been demonstrated to be detectable in lupus patients diagnosed with secondary Sjogren’s, albeit at lower levels than RA patients.

References

Further reading

External links 
 
 

Genes
14-3-3 proteins